On December 4, 2020, a series of flash floods hit many areas in Medan, North Sumatra, Indonesia, due to heavy rain the previous night. Impacting three of the 21 administrative districts in the city, it caused property damage, over 5,000 injuries, and six reported deaths.

Incident 
On circa 20:00 WIB, 3 December, 2020, a rain hit Medan. No severe thing occurred, until a levee in Belawan River and several other rivers like the Deli River and Denai River broke, and waters started rushing, causing much of the flood. An hour later, floods started hitting several places, going as deep as 15-60cm, categorizable as a flash flood event. Transport mobility became quickly burdened, and traffic jams were observed. In some places, the flood, also containing trash, entered houses. The Indonesian Meteorology, Climatology, and Geophysical Agency (BMKG) predicted mild rain in several areas in Medan. It also issued a warning on the probability of floods and landslides, inflamed by strong winds, in the east and western area. By 4:00, the Deli River rushed so strong that houses were immediately damaged.

By 8:00, the flood gets deeper, most significantly in the Lalang Village. It is the first major flood in the area since 2013. As floods hit the roads, traffic becomes more congested, most concerningly disadvantaging food deliverers. Some vehicles also drowned. In some areas, floods reached the roofs of houses. Later, the Medan-Binjai toll road was flooded.

The intensity of the rain reduced at around 16:30.

Impacts and aftermath 
By afternoon, as much as 2,733 homes have been reportedly impacted by the flood, and seven districts victimized, as well as 5,965 people injured. A Kompas update also reports 6 people missing and 2 dead at the same time. Impoverished people were rescued out of their destroyed houses by the search and rescue team. 50 policemen were sent to search for victims; the focus search point is at the De Flamboyan estate. The first victim reported dead is a 30-year-old female wearing "long, red sleeves," found in the river near Bokek Beach on 6:20. Not long later, a 20-year-old male, wearing "yellow jacket and jeans," named Heka, in the Griya Nusa III Tanjung Selamat residence, Medan Tuntungan; a female was near his body when discovered, whilst crying of grievance. In addition to property damage, a suspension bridge in Aloha Village nearly broke due to the water rushing.

By 16:30, five of the six missing people have been found dead; one is still being searched. Breaking down, one child, three females, and one male died. 181 people have been rescued. An hour later, the last person was found dead. Two of the dead died of being washed by the river. However, deaths are likely to be more than just six. Impacted administrative districts are Medan Johor, Maimun, Sunggal, and Tuntungan.

Medan mayor candidate Bobby Nasution observes several impacted sites and offers lunch for the victims. Meanwhile, incumbent Edy Rahmayadi announced humanitarian aids to the victims. The Gelora Party made a chain of soup kitchens called "Dapur Berkah Gelora," which translates to "Gelora Glorious Kitchen," which operated for 24 hours in feeding the poor victims. The response from the party was well-received by the locals.

To prevent future accidents from happening, locals built an emergency dam made from sand wrapped with sacks of plant fibers, placed in areas of rivers untouched by the flood.

Online, #prayformedan became trending for a short while.

References 

Floods in Indonesia
2020 in Indonesia